St Mary's College (formerly Christian Brothers College, St Kilda) is an independent Catholic secondary school for boys and girls, located in Melbourne, Victoria, Australia. The school was founded in 1878 and is both one of the oldest private schools in Melbourne and the only co-educational Catholic school in inner Melbourne. Originally founded as Christian Brothers College, St Kilda, and run by the Christian Brothers, the school has long since had a lay teaching and administrative staff. The school is member of Edmund Rice Education Australia  and is also a member of Associated Catholic Colleges. 

St Mary's consists of two campuses.

History

In 2019, after Presentation College Windsor announced it was shutting down at the end of the 2020 school year, CBC St Kilda announced it would be going from a boys school to a co-educational school. On 23 November 2020, CBC St Kilda announced the change of name to St Mary's College.

Sport 
St Mary's is a founding member of the Associated Catholic Colleges (ACC) and the Secondary Catholic Sports Association (SCSA).

ACC premierships 
Christian Brothers' College, St Kilda   won the following ACC premierships.

 Athletics (16) - 1918, 1919, 1920, 1923, 1927, 1935, 1942, 1950, 1951, 1952, 1953, 1954, 1957, 1960, 1968, 1971
 Basketball - 2014
 Cricket (11) - 1932, 1933, 1935, 1936, 1937, 1940, 1941, 1942, 1944, 1948, 1967
 Cross Country - 1975
 Football (14) - 1933, 1934, 1936, 1937, 1941, 1949, 1951, 1952, 1956, 1958, 1959, 1963, 1969, 1971
 Handball - 1953
 Hockey (3) - 1982, 2007, 2011
 Soccer (4) - 1978, 1987, 1997, 2007
 Swimming (23) - 1932, 1933, 1934, 1935, 1944, 1945, 1946, 1947, 1948, 1949, 1950, 1951, 1954, 1955, 1959, 1960, 1961, 1968, 1969, 1970, 1971, 1972, 1977
 Tennis (4) - 1939, 1940, 1941, 1945

Notable alumni

The arts, media and entertainment
 John Burns – radio presenter
 Ronald Conway –  psychologist and author of The Great Australian Stupor
 Peter Corrigan – architect of international renown
 Frank Howson – noted scriptwriter and film director
 Richard Hughes  – journalist, foreign correspondent in Asia
 Daniel Keene – noted playwright
 Eddie McGuire – television personality, former CEO of the Nine Network
 Bob Maguire  – priest, community worker and media personality 
 Felix Mallard – actor and musician
 Shane Maloney – novelist
 Barry Oakley – writer and former literary editor of The Australian newspaper
 Damien Parer – war photographer, filmed the first Australian film to win an Academy Award (1942)
 Daryl Somers  – television personality
 Kevin Summers – actor, playwright
 Gerard Vaughan – director of the National Gallery of Australia
 Morris West – writer of international renown

Business

 Paul Gardner – former chairman of Grey Global, chairman of the Melbourne Football Club
 Robert James Thomson – editor-in-chief of Dow Jones & Company and the managing editor of The Wall Street Journal, and former editor of The Times

Government, law and military

 James Reginald Halligan  – senior public servant 
 Richard Keane – prominent trade unionist and trade minister in the Chifley Labor government
 Tony Lupton – cabinet secretary, Brumby Labor government, Victoria, 2002– 2014
 John Madigan – senator representing Victoria (2011– 2016) and deputy leader of the DLP
 Frank McGuire – Labor Party Member of the Victorian Legislative Assembly for Broadmeadows (2011 – present)
 Sir Frank Meere – senior public servant

Sport
 Atu Bosenavulagi – Australian rules footballer for Collingwood
 Simon Meehan – Australian rules footballer for St Kilda
 Patrick John O'Dea – Australian rules footballer turned American football player
 Kevin O'Donnell – Australian rules footballer, father of Simon O'Donnell

References

External links
 Official website

Catholic secondary schools in Melbourne
Congregation of Christian Brothers secondary schools in Australia
Associated Catholic Colleges
Educational institutions established in 1878
1878 establishments in Australia
St Kilda East, Victoria
Buildings and structures in the City of Stonnington